The Widow's Son may refer to:

 The Widow's Son, London, a public house in London
 The Widow's Son (album), the sixth studio album by the rapper Apathy
 The Widow's Son (book), the second book in the series The Historical Illuminatus Chronicles
  The Widow's Son in the Windshield, the first episode of season 3 of the American television series Bones
 Hiram Abiff, Masonic legendary figure also called 'The Widow's Son'